Amphidromus porcellanus is a species of air-breathing land snail, a terrestrial pulmonate gastropod mollusk in the family Camaenidae.

The anatomy of this species was described by Carl Arend Friedrich Wiegmann in 1898.

References

External links 

porcellanus
Gastropods described in 1848